The 1923 World Hard Court Championships (WHCC) (French: Championnats du Monde de Tennis sur Terre Battue) was the seventh and last edition of the World Hard Court Championships tennis tournament, considered as the precursor to the French Open. It was organised by the Fédération Française de Tennis and was held on the clay courts of the Stade Français at the Parc de Saint-Cloud in Paris from 19 until 27 May 1923.

Men's singles 

 Bill Johnston defeated  Jean Washer, 4–6, 6–2, 6–2, 4–6, 6–3

Women's singles 

 Suzanne Lenglen defeated  Kitty McKane, 6–3, 6–3

Men's doubles 

 Jacques Brugnon /  Marcel Dupont defeated  Léonce Aslangul /  Uberto de Morpurgo, 10–12, 3–6, 6–2, 6–3, 6–4

Women's doubles 

 Winifred Beamish /  Kitty McKane defeated  Germaine Golding /  Suzanne Lenglen,  6–2, 6–3

Mixed doubles 

 Henri Cochet /  Suzanne Lenglen defeated  Brian Gilbert /  Kitty McKane, 6–2, 10–8

External links 
 
 

World Hard Court Championships
World Hard Court Championships
World Hard Court Championships
May 1923 sports events
1923 in French tennis